Santiano is a German band from the northern state of Schleswig-Holstein, Germany, whose songs combine rock, Irish folk, sea shanty, and schlager music. The name Santiano is taken from the Hugues Aufray song of the same name. They topped the German album charts multiple times in the 2010s, also ranking high in Austrian and Swiss charts.

History
The idea for the band originated with German producer Hartmut Krech of Flensburg, who owns the Elephant Music label. On 3 February 2012, the band appeared at We Love Music, an event promoted by Universal Music and ProSiebenSat.1 Media. Their first album, titled Bis ans Ende der Welt ('To the end of the World'), was released in 2012. It reached #1 in the German charts. That same year, the group completed a European tour, including a performance at the Wacken Open Air festival. A live CD/DVD of the event was released in November 2012.

In 2013 and 2014, they received an Echo award for best Folk music. Santiano appeared as an opening act for Helene Fischer's 2013 summer tour, and toured Germany from November 2013 to April 2014.

Their second studio album, Mit den Gezeiten ("With the tides"), was released in 2013 and reached #1 in the German charts. This album contains more rock elements than "Bis ans Ende der Welt" but still draws upon themes surrounding the sea and North German myths.

In 2014, they participated in Unser Song für Dänemark, the national selection for the Eurovision Song Contest 2014 with the songs Wir werden niemals untergehen and Fiddler on the Deck. They were eliminated in Round 2 of the final.

Their third studio album, Von Liebe, Tod und Freiheit ("On love, death and freedom") was released in May 2015 and provided the band with another #1 album in Germany. As its title suggests, deeper themes are addressed in the lyrics of this album but this is offset by a number of folk-based songs which promote the importance of camaraderie and togetherness when dealing with such themes.

The band appeared for a fourth time at the Wacken Open Air festival in 2015 and continued to tour into 2016.

Discography

Albums

EPs
 2021: Sea Shanties – Wellerman

Music videos
 2012: Frei wie der Wind
 2013: Gott muss ein Seemann sein
 2015: Lieder der Freiheit
 2015: Weh mir
 2017: Könnt ihr mich hören
 2017: Ich bring dich heim
 2018: Mädchen von Haithabu
 2021: Wellerman
 2021: Wenn die Kälte kommt
 2021: Was du liebst
 2022: Durch jeden Sturm

References

External links

 
 "Santiano" – Seemanns-Pop frisch von der Förde

German folk music groups
Schleswig-Holstein
Irish folk musicians